Kisii may refer to:

 Kisii, Kenya, the inaugural capital city of Kenya 
 Kisii County, one of the 47 counties of Kenya
 Gucha District, in Kenya, also known as South Kisii District
 Nyamira District, in Kenya, also known as North Kisii District
 Kisii people, an ethnic group in Kenya, also known as Abagusii or Gusii people
 Gusii language, spoken by the Kisii people
 Kisii School for the Deaf, the only Deaf-run school for Deaf children in Kenya
 Kisii stone, a name for soapstone, quarried in Tabaka area of southern Kisii District
 Kisii University, Kenya

Language and nationality disambiguation pages